Luvsansharavyn Rentsendorj (born 25 February 1946) is a Mongolian judoka. He competed in the men's half-heavyweight event at the 1972 Summer Olympics.

References

1946 births
Living people
Mongolian male judoka
Olympic judoka of Mongolia
Judoka at the 1972 Summer Olympics
Place of birth missing (living people)